Waratah-Wynyard Council is a local government body in Tasmania, situated in the north-west of the state. Waratah-Wynyard is classified as a rural local government area and has a population of 13,800, the major towns and localities of the region include Savage River, Sisters Beach, Somerset, Waratah and the principal town of Wynyard.

History and attributes
On 2 April 1993, the municipalities of Waratah and Wynyard were amalgamated to form the Waratah-Wynyard Council. There had been suggestion of renaming the council to Table Cape, which was the former name of the Wynyard Council until 1945, but this move failed at the ballot box.

Waratah-Wynyard is classified as rural, agricultural and very large under the Australian Classification of Local Governments.

Logo

The former logo of the council was selected from 124 competition entries in 1987. The enlarged "W" below Table Cape is indicative of ploughed paddocks representing the rural heritage - a lighthouse and a seagull were added to the final design. The word 'Waratah' was added in 1993 following the amalgamation of the councils.

Government
The current mayor is Robert "Robby" Walsh and the current deputy mayor is Mary Duniam. Other sitting councillors are Gary Bramich, Darren Fairbrother, Kevin Hyland, Maureen Bradley, Celisa Edwards and Andrea Courtney. All councillors will be up for re-election in 2022.

Previous mayors
 Roger Chalk (October 2000 – October 2005)
Kevin Hyland (October 2005 – December 2010)

Localities

Not in above list
 Hampshire
 Luina
 Montumana
 Rocky Cape
 West Coast

See also
List of local government areas of Tasmania

References

External links

Waratah-Wynyard Council official website
Local Government Association Tasmania
Tasmanian Electoral Commission - local government

Local government areas of Tasmania